Algarve Churro is a domesticated breed of sheep in Portugal. Although this breed does grow wool, it is primarily raised for its meat.

Characteristics
Most of the Algarve Churro are white with black spots on the feet and head.  However, about 10% of the population are completely black.  Both sexes are horned.

History
This breed originated from Andalusian Churro which were imported in the late 19th century.  The population of this breed has been decreasing.  In 1996, there were greater than 23,000 and in 2004, there were greater than 1300.

References

Sheep breeds
Sheep breeds originating in Portugal